Mafamude is a former civil parish in the municipality of Vila Nova de Gaia, Portugal. In 2013, the parish merged into the new parish Mafamude e Vilar do Paraíso. The population in 2011 was 38,544, in an area of 5.28 km². It is an urban parish in the city of Gaia.

Heritage 
Cedro Primary School (Escola Primária do Cedro)

Notable people from Mafamude 
António Soares dos Reis

References 

Former parishes of Vila Nova de Gaia